Elena Penga (born ) is a Greek playwright, poet, fiction writer, and stage director. 

Penga attended college and graduate school in the United States and staged her first plays in New York’s off-off Broadway scene before returning to Greece in the 1990s. Her plays have been produced at the National Theatre of Greece, National Theatre of Northern Greece, the Athens Festival and Delphi among many other theaters. Her work has been widely translated and performed in the US, Europe and the middle east. Her book Tight Belts and Other Skin (Agra, 2012) received the Ourani Prize of The Greek Academy of Letters and has been translated into Swedish and English. She is a co-author of the screenplay for the 2001 film adaptation of The Only Journey of His Life, about the Greek short-story writer Giorgios Vizyenos, which won the best film award in the Greek State Film Awards.

Early life 
Penga was born in Thessaloniki. She attended college in the United States, earning a bachelor's degree in philosophy and theater at Wesleyan University and a master's degree in scriptwriting at the University of Southern California. She returned to Greece in the early 1990s.

Style and themes 
Penga's work was described as dark and poetic by Cosmopoliti. Penga writes about the everyday aspects of politics and explores how individuals feel the repercussions of violence on a large scale. Her dramatic writing investigates issues of human existence, and explores the metaphysical and philosophical dimensions that present themselves in the dull, sometimes mundane lives of ordinary people. Her writing reflects contemporary Greek influences.

David Wallace of The New Yorker, in his review of the anthology Austerity Measures- The New Greek Poetry, writes:

Plays 
Most of her plays have been published in Greek.

 Πορνοστάρ – Η αόρατη βιομηχανία του σεξ, (Pornstar: The Invisible Sex Industry) 2018.  Produced by the Athens and Epidavros Festival in 2018.
 Γυναίκα και Λύκος - Woman and Wolf, 2014.  Presented at the Municipal Theater of Peireus.
Narcissus, 2011
 Phaedra Or Alcestis- Love Stories, 2007.  Presented at the European Cultural Center of Delphi.
 Who are our new friends?,  2006.  Produced at New Friends by the National Theater of Northern Greece.
 Nelly’s takes her dog out for a walk, 2003
When the Go-Go Dancers dance, 2002
3-0-1 TRANSPORTS, 2000
 Emperor’s New Clothes, based on Andersen’s fairytale, 1999
 Waltz Excitation, 1998
Kaethe Kollwitz presents a brief history of modern art, 1995
Gorky’s Wife, 1995
 A king listens, based on a short story by Italo Calvino, 1994
 The Greek Alien & Poisons of the Sea, 1993
 6 Jealous Numbers, based on Othello by Shakespeare, 1992
 Don Surrealism, one-act, 1991

Fiction and poetry 
ΑΘΗΝΑ-ΔΕΛΧΙ-ΑΘΗΝΑ (Athens-Delhi-Athens), novel (Agra, 2019)
ΣΦΙΧΤΕΣ ΖΩΝΕΣ ΚΑΙ ΑΛΛΑ ΔΕΡΜΑΤΑ (Tight Belts and Other Skins), novella (Agra, 2011) (2012 Literary Award of the Kostas and Eleni Ouranis Foundation)
 ΣΚΟΥΩΣ - ΣΤΙΓΜΕΣ ΑΝΤΡΙΚΕΣ ΚΑΙ ΓΥΝΑΙΚΕΙΕΣ (Squash - Moments Male and Female), novella (1997)
 ΑΥΤΗ ΘΕΡΙΝΗ (She Summer Like), novella (Agra, 1986)

Penga's poetry has been anthologized in, among others, Austerity Measures, translated into English by Karen Van Dyck.<ref>Wallace, David. "Greek Poetry in the Shadow of Austerity", The New Yorker, June 27, 2017, accessed June 12, 2020</ref> Austerity Measures also includes short prose from her collection Tight Belts and Other Skin, published by Penguin, 2016, and also published by New York Review of Books, 2017 She is also included in the English anthology The Penguin Book of The Prose Poem: From Baudelaire to Anne Carson, Penguin UK, 2018

Her short story, "The Untrodden" ("Το Αβατον"), Dalkey Archive Press (2016), translated into English by Karen Van Dyck, won the award for Best European Fiction (2017)

References

External links
Elena Penga profile in The Brooklyn Rail''

21st-century Greek dramatists and playwrights
21st-century Greek poets
Greek theatre directors
Writers from Thessaloniki
Wesleyan University alumni
University of Southern California alumni
Living people
Year of birth missing (living people)